Searsia may refer to:

 Searsia (fish), a genus of fish in the family Platytroctidae
 Searsia (plant), a genus of plants in the family Anacardiaceae